White Paws (French: Pattes blanches) is a 1949 French drama film directed by Jean Grémillon and starring Suzy Delair, Fernand Ledoux and Paul Bernard. The Paws of the title refer to the white spats wore by the protagonist, the aristocratic owner of an estate on the French coast.

It was shot at the Neuilly Studios in Paris and on location in Erquy in Brittany. The film's sets were designed by the art director Léon Barsacq. Grémillon had attempted to produce several film projects since the financial failure of The Woman Who Dared in 1944, but this was the first feature he had managed to make. Similar in plot and atmosphere to his wartime film Summer Light, this resulted in another commercial failure and Grémillon's eclipse as a leading French director by other filmmakers such as Henri Georges-Clouzot.

Synopsis
In Brittany, inn owner Jock Le Guen brings his mistress Odette back to town with him, but she soon takes up with the aristocratic eccentric Julien de Keriadec, derisively known to the inhabitants as "White Paws". Their relationship ultimately ends tragically.

Cast
 Suzy Delair as Odette Kerouan
 Fernand Ledoux as Jock Le Guen
 Paul Bernard as Julien de Keriadec- Pattes Blanches
 Arlette Thomas as Mimi la bossue
 Michel Bouquet as Maurice
 Geneviève Morel as Marguerite
 Paul Barge as Un invité 
 Betty Daussmond as La tante de Julien
 Philippe Sergeol as Un invité 
 Sylvie as La mère de Maurice
 Jean Debucourt as Le juge d'instruction

References

Bibliography 
 Williams, Alan. Republic of Images: A History of French Filmmaking. Harvard University Press, 1992.

External links 
 

1949 films
1949 drama films
French drama films
1940s French-language films
Films directed by Jean Grémillon
Films set in Brittany
1950s French films
1940s French films
Films with screenplays by Jean Anouilh